Bohdan Rudyuk (born 19 April 1994) is a professional Ukrainian football defender.

Career
Rudiuk is a product of the youth team systems of FC Helios and FC Vostok. During 2011–2012 he played in the amateur teams of Luhansk Oblast, and in 2012 signed a contract with SC Tavriya and played in the Ukrainian Premier League Reserves and Under 19 Championship, but in January 2013 he signed a contract with FC Zorya Then he transferred to Slovakia and played in the different 3 clubs.

References

External links

1994 births
Living people
Ukrainian footballers
Association football defenders
Ukrainian expatriate footballers
Expatriate footballers in Slovakia
Expatriate footballers in Belarus
Ukrainian expatriate sportspeople in Slovakia
Ukrainian expatriate sportspeople in Belarus
SC Tavriya Simferopol players
FC Zorya Luhansk players
FK Bodva Moldava nad Bodvou players
MŠK Rimavská Sobota players
FK Poprad players
2. Liga (Slovakia) players
FC Slutsk players
FC Dnepr Mogilev players
FC Krumkachy Minsk players
FC Stal Kamianske players
Sportspeople from Kharkiv Oblast